Melting Millions is a 1917 American silent comedy film directed by Otis Turner and starring Sydney Deane, Cecil Holland, Velma Whitman, George Walsh, and Frank Alexander. The film was released by Fox Film Corporation on February 19, 1917.

Plot
Jack Ballentine, young and irresponsible, discovers that in order to inherit his uncle's fortune, he must prove to Mrs. Walton, his guardian, that he is a competent businessman. Jack, totally devoid of any business acumen, doesn't hit one. Escaped to the West, he saves a girl and her father from a gang of robbers, while Mrs. Walton freezes his bank accounts, leaving him penniless. The young man proves brave, however, when he saves Jane, the girl, from being kidnapped by her father's former secretary, thus finally winning the approval of Mrs. Walton.

Cast
Sydney Deane as Uncle Peter
Cecil Holland as Casey
Velma Whitman as Mrs. Wilson
George Walsh as Jack Ballantine
Frank Alexander as Bailey
Anna Luther as Jane
Charles K. Gerrard as Hamilton

Preservation
The film is now considered lost.

References

External links

1917 comedy films
Silent American comedy films
1917 films
American silent feature films
American black-and-white films
Fox Film films
Lost American films
Lost comedy films
1917 lost films
Films directed by Otis Turner
1910s American films